Phrealcia steueri is a species of moth of the family Ypsolophidae. It is found in Xinjiang, China.

References

Moths described in 2012
Ypsolophidae
Moths of Asia